Barrett Lancaster Brown (born 14 August 1981) is an American journalist, essayist, activist and former associate of Anonymous. In 2010, he founded Project PM, a group that used a wiki to analyze leaks concerning the military-industrial complex, which was labeled a "criminal organization" by the Department of Justice. In late 2020, Brown restarted Project PM. 

In January 2015, Brown was sentenced to 63 months in federal prison for the crimes of accessory after the fact, obstruction of justice, and threatening a federal officer stemming from the FBI's investigation into the 2012 Stratfor email leak. Prosecutors had previously brought other charges associated with sharing a link to the leaked Stratfor data, but those charges were dropped in 2014. As part of his sentence, Brown was also required to pay almost $900,000 to Stratfor in restitution.

In November 2020, Brown claimed asylum in the UK on the basis that he had been persecuted in the US for his journalism. Brown says in 2021 he overheard officers discussing sealed charges in the US against him when he was arrested in London for allegedly overstaying his visa and incitement offenses. He was convicted of causing intentional, harassment alarm or distress.

Early life and education 

Brown was born and grew up in Dallas and exhibited an early interest in writing and journalism, creating his own newspapers on his family's computer while attending Preston Hollow Elementary School. He went on to contribute to his school newspapers, and interned at several weekly newspapers during his teenage years. He attended the Episcopal School of Dallas through his sophomore year of high school, then spent his would-be junior year in Tanzania with his father who was residing there on business. While in Africa, Brown completed high school online through a Texas Tech University program, earning college credits as well as his high school diploma. In 2000 he enrolled at the University of Texas at Austin and spent two semesters taking writing courses before leaving school to pursue a full-time career as a freelance writer.

Journalism
In 2010, Brown began work on his crowdsourced investigation wiki, Project PM, which was labeled a "criminal organization" by the Department of Justice. By Brown's count, Project PM had 75 members at its peak who communicated through an IRC chat room and published their findings on the Project PM wiki. The group dug through huge amounts of hacked files and emails from intelligence contractors, hoping to expose companies like HBGary and Stratfor, earning the trust of the hacktivist community.

In June 2011, he and Project PM released an exclusive report about a surveillance contract called "Romas/COIN" which was discovered in e-mails hacked from HBGary by Anonymous. It consisted of sophisticated data-mining techniques leveraging mobile software and aimed at Arab countries. After Project PM was shutdown by his 2012 arrest and incarceration, he restarted it in late 2020 while seeking asylum in the UK.

From September 2012, during his incarceration, Brown wrote a series of columns for D Magazine titled "The Barrett Brown Review of Arts and Letters and Jail". In 2015 he transitioned from D to The Intercept. In 2016 The Intercept won a National Magazine Award for three of Barrett's columns. In 2019 he burned his National Magazine Award to protest The Intercept closing the Snowden archives.

In 2017, Brown launched the Pursuance Project, which aimed to unite transparency activists, investigative journalists, FOIA specialists and hacktivists in a fully encrypted platform. Brown said that Pursuance would take hacktivism into the future, letting anyone sort through troves of hacked documents and even recruit teams of hackers. Pursuance's goal was to offer task management and automation environment for collaborative investigations into the surveillance state. In 2018, Brown raised over $50,000 for Pursuance Project on Kickstarter. In February 2020, Brown shut Pursuance Project down, writing that Pursuance would resume work later that year funded via settlements from libel suits. The Pursuance software was last updated in October 2018 and is available as a demo on GitHub.

In a December 2020 update, Brown said they used the money but weren't able to make a prototype. He also discussed starting abusing methamphetamines a year and a half earlier, noting it elevated his work and his ability to wreak havoc on elements of the press and police agencies. He also discussed going to rehab. Brown said that his drug use and time in rehab was one reason Pursuance hadn't been updated, but that the Project was back from hiatus.

Brown has written for The Daily Beast, Vanity Fair, True/Slant, The Huffington Post, The Guardian, Skeptical Inquirer, WhoWhatWhy, and other outlets.

Association with Anonymous
In November 2011, Brown said that 75 names of members of the Zetas drug cartel would be released if a member of the Anonymous group who had been kidnapped was not set free. Brown says the member was then released and that there was a truce between him and the drug cartel for the moment. Others have said the kidnapping was fake, noting a lack of details and police reports.

Some media outlets have presented Brown as a self-proclaimed spokesperson for Anonymous, which he disputes, saying "it doesn't work that way." In 2011, Brown announced that he and Gregg Housh, another former member of Anonymous, had signed a contract estimated at more than $100,000 with Amazon to write a book tentatively titled Anonymous: Tales From Inside The Accidental Cyberwar. The book was never released, Brown said in a podcast that he spent the money. 

Brown has said he renounced his links with the group in 2011. In December 2011, Brown told reporters that Anonymous had hacked millions of emails from Stratfor over Christmas and that they would be released by WikiLeaks.

Criticism of Assange and WikiLeaks 

Brown has criticized Julian Assange for his secretive collaboration with the Trump campaign and then allegedly lying about it.

In November 2017, it was revealed that the WikiLeaks Twitter account secretly corresponded with Donald Trump Jr. during the 2016 presidential election. The correspondence shows how WikiLeaks actively solicited the co-operation of Trump Jr., a campaign surrogate and advisor in the campaign of his father. WikiLeaks urged the Trump campaign to reject the results of the 2016 presidential election at a time when it looked as if the Trump campaign would lose. WikiLeaks asked Trump Jr. to share a WikiLeaks tweet with the quote "Can't we just drone this guy?" which True Pundit alleged Hillary Clinton made about Assange. WikiLeaks also shared a link to a site that would help people to search through WikiLeaks documents. Trump Jr. shared both. After the election, WikiLeaks also requested that the president-elect push Australia to appoint Assange as ambassador to the US. Trump Jr. provided this correspondence to congressional investigators looking into Russian interference in the 2016 election.

The secretive exchanges led to criticism of WikiLeaks by some former supporters. Assange had asserted the Clinton campaign was "constantly slandering" WikiLeaks of being a 'pro-Trump' 'pro-Russia' source. Barrett Brown, a long-time defender of WikiLeaks, was exasperated that Assange was "complaining about 'slander' of being pro-Trump IN THE ACTUAL COURSE OF COLLABORATING WITH TRUMP". He also wrote: "Was "Wikileaks staff" lying on Nov 10 2016 when they claimed "The allegations that we have colluded with Trump, or any other candidate for that matter, or with Russia, are just groundless and false", or did Assange lie to them?"

Brown said Assange had acted "as a covert political operative", thus betraying WikiLeaks' focus on exposing "corporate and government wrongdoing". He considered the latter to be "an appropriate thing to do", but that "working with an authoritarian would-be leader to deceive the public is indefensible and disgusting".

In 2018, three trustees of the Courage Foundation decided to remove Brown from the Courage Foundation's beneficiary list over "nasty adversarial remarks" he had made about Julian Assange, and a decision was made to prioritise the case of Wikileaks over all other beneficiaries. Courage trustee Susan Benn told Brown that Courage would no longer help him, writing in an email that "You have made a number of hostile and denigrating statements about other Courage beneficiaries who are facing grave legal and personal risks. Courage expects solidarity and mutual aid from its beneficiaries, especially when those among you face extreme uncertainty and danger."

In response, Courage Foundation Director Naomi Colvin quit in protest and Brown alleged that he had only been given about $3,500 out of the total $14,000 that had been donated to Courage for him. Renata Ávila called Brown's comments "disloyal and unacceptable."

Arrests and trials

United States 
On March 6, 2012, the FBI executed search warrants at Brown's apartment and his mother's house seeking evidence of alleged crimes. The items to be seized included "Records relating to HBGary, Infragard, Endgame Systems, Anonymous, LulzSec, IRC Chats, Twitter, wiki.echelon2.org, and pastebin.com." During the search, agents took possession of his laptop computers. Brown confirmed on Twitter that the FBI raided his residence after receiving information from Hector Xavier Monsegur (also known as Sabu), the founder of LulzSec.

The seized laptops included no less than 3,000 pages of chat logs from March 2011 to February 2012. These chats were produced as evidence in the trial against Jeremy Hammond and in Brown's trial. Journalists familiar with the evidence against Brown said the total number of pages of chat logs may have been in the tens of thousands, potentially revealing his contacts with hackers and other sources who thought they were speaking in confidence.

On September 12, 2012, Brown was arrested in Dallas County, Texas for threatening an FBI agent in a YouTube video. His arrest occurred as he left a computer linked to Tinychat in which the raid could be heard in the background. Brown has talked publicly about his history of using heroin and he was going through withdrawal on the day of his arrest.

A magistrate denied bail because he was judged "a danger to the safety of the community and a risk of flight." On October 3, 2012, a federal grand jury indictment was returned against Brown on charges of threats, conspiracy and retaliation against a federal law enforcement officer. Various tweets, YouTube uploads and comments made by Brown before his arrest were cited as support within the indictment.

On December 4, 2012, Brown was indicted on an additional 12 federal charges related to the December 25, 2011 hack of Austin-based private intelligence company Stratfor. A trove of millions of Stratfor emails from the hack, including authentication information for thousands of credit card, was shared by the hacker collective LulzSec with WikiLeaks. Brown faced up to 45 years in federal prison for allegedly sharing a link to the data as part of Project PM. On January 23, 2013, a third indictment was filed against Brown on two counts of obstruction for concealing evidence during the March 6, 2012 FBI raid of his and his mother's homes. Brown's mother was sentenced on November 8, 2013, to six months of probation and a $1,000 fine for a misdemeanor charge of obstructing the execution of a search warrant.

As of September 4, 2013, Brown was under a federal court-issued gag order; he and his lawyers were not allowed to discuss his case with the media, lest it taint a jury. Assistant United States Attorney Candina S. Heath said that Brown tried to manipulate the media from behind bars for his benefit, that Brown's attorney "coordinates and/or approves of his use of the media," and that most of the publicity about Brown has contained false information and "gross fabrications". Defense counsel maintained the gag order was an unfounded and unwarranted breach of Brown's First Amendment rights.

In March 2014, most charges against Brown were dropped. In April 2014, it was reported that Brown had agreed to a plea bargain.

The government introduced additional chat logs seized from Brown's laptop at sentencing in an attempt to frame him as a central figure in Anonymous and the Stratfor hack. This caused further delays, as the defense was not given prior access. In January 2015, Brown was sentenced to 63 months in prison. He was also ordered to pay $890,250 in fines and restitution. Journalist Janus Kopfstein accused the government of making false statements to attempt to convict Brown. Much of Brown's December sentencing hearing was spent in drawn-out arguments over the definitions of Project PM and Brown himself.

Brown was released from prison on November 29, 2016, and moved into a halfway house with five drug dealers close to downtown Dallas, Texas. On April 27, 2017, Brown was arrested and held on unknown charges for four days. After he was released, he gave an interview to Democracy Now! while under house arrest, despite pressure from the government not to speak to the media.

In 2021, he claimed he overheard officers discussing sealed charges in the US against him when he was arrested in London.

United Kingdom 
In April 2021, images and videos spread online of him holding a protest banner which said: "Kill Cops" near where an officer had been killed. Metropolitan Police tweeted they were trying to identify him and right-wing journalist Andy Ngô tweeted an accusation that he was "antifa-linked". Claims spread online that Brown was an undercover police officer, under police protection or a agent provocateur. The Metropolitan Police told Reuters and Brown wrote online that the claims were false.

In May 2021, he was arrested on his girlfriend’s canal boat in east London, being there since November 2020 to claim asylum, for allegedly overstaying his visa and two incitement offenses related to the banner. The arresting officer initially charged him under an incorrect code. An internal memo included a statement by Metropolitan Police Federation Chair Ken Marsh calling the banner "abhorrent, unacceptable, and dangerous behaviour" that could have resulted "in a tragedy." After he was released on bail, he was detained by immigration authorities for overstaying his visa. He plead not guilty and was convicted of one charge of causing intentional, harassment alarm or distress.

Subpoena for legal fund donor information 
In 2017, lawyers for donors to Brown's legal fund filed suit against Assistant United States Attorney Candina Heath for filing a subpoena against WePay that resulted in divulgence of their identities. The lawyers argued that the irrelevance of donor information to the case against Brown and the provision of the information directly to Special Agent Robert Smith of the Federal Bureau of Investigation rather than to the prosecutor or judge in the trial led to donors' belief that the information was intended to surveil and harass the donors for activity protected by the U.S. constitution, and filed for destruction of the data and monetary damages. On October 2, 2017, Judge Maria Elena James denied a motion to dismiss the case introduced by the Department of Justice.

Social media bans 
Brown's Twitter account, @BarrettBrown_, has been permanently banned from Twitter four times and remains banned. He has joked that he holds the record for most Twitter permanent bans. 

The first three bans were overturned. According to a Counterpunch journalist, one of the bans was prompted by Brown posting what he said was proof he didn't rape a woman, a ban described by Twitter as errors after journalists inquired, but the fourth was not. The fourth and final ban was prompted by Brown tweeting that Assange should not be on trial but that he would "deserve to die by other, cleaner hands" if he knew of Erik Prince's alleged ties to Roger Stone.

Brown's twitter account for the Pursuance Project was also banned for ban evasion and platform manipulation after it was falsely reported, according to The Daily Dot.

Mental health 
Brown has talked publicly about his history of drug use, including heroin and suboxone in the early 2010s and methamphetamines and marihuana in the late 2010s and early 2020s. In a June 2022 interview, Brown said he has "done drugs on major national outlets," and that he used suboxone for the last ten years.

In 2022, he accused his friends of working to put him in prison, before attempting to commit suicide. According to Brown, the episode resulted from him suffering from Complex post-traumatic stress disorder. Twelve days later, Brown said he had mostly recovered.

In the press and the arts
Relatively Free is a documentary film released in 2016 by Field of Vision about Brown's drive across Texas to a halfway house after he was released from prison.

Barrett Brown's case was included as a plot point in Season 2 of the U.S. TV series House of Cards because of input from Brown's friend and fellow Anonymous member, Gregg Housh.

According to NPR, Elliot from the TV series Mr. Robot was based on Brown - "a drug addict who can't access his own emotions."

Brown serves on the advisory board of the International Modern Media Institute.

See also

References

Further reading

External links

 

1981 births
American criminals
American investigative journalists
American journalists
American non-fiction writers
Anonymous (hacker group)
Anonymous (hacker group) activists
Living people
People associated with computer security
People from Dallas
Twitter controversies
Writers from Texas
WikiLeaks